Zanola poecila is a moth in the family Apatelodidae. It was described by Max Wilhelm Karl Draudt in 1929.

References

Apatelodidae
Moths described in 1929